The first of the two 2020 Drydene 200s was the 20th stock car race of the 2020 NASCAR Xfinity Series season, and the 39th iteration of the event. The race was held on Saturday, August 22, 2020 in Dover, Delaware at Dover International Speedway, a  permanent oval-shaped racetrack. The race was originally to be held on May 2, but was postponed to August 22 due to the COVID-19 pandemic. The race took the scheduled 200 laps to complete. At race's end, Justin Allgaier of JR Motorsports would win the race in dominating fashion, winning the 12th race of his career in the NASCAR Xfinity Series and the first of the season. To fill the podium, Austin Cindric of Team Penske and Ross Chastain of Kaulig Racing would finish 2nd and 3rd, respectively.

Background 

Dover International Speedway is an oval race track in Dover, Delaware, United States that has held at least two NASCAR races since it opened in 1969. In addition to NASCAR, the track also hosted USAC and the NTT IndyCar Series. The track features one layout, a 1 mile (1.6 km) concrete oval, with 24° banking in the turns and 9° banking on the straights. The speedway is owned and operated by Dover Motorsports.

The track, nicknamed "The Monster Mile", was built in 1969 by Melvin Joseph of Melvin L. Joseph Construction Company, Inc., with an asphalt surface, but was replaced with concrete in 1995. Six years later in 2001, the track's capacity moved to 135,000 seats, making the track have the largest capacity of sports venue in the mid-Atlantic. In 2002, the name changed to Dover International Speedway from Dover Downs International Speedway after Dover Downs Gaming and Entertainment split, making Dover Motorsports. From 2007 to 2009, the speedway worked on an improvement project called "The Monster Makeover", which expanded facilities at the track and beautified the track. After the 2014 season, the track's capacity was reduced to 95,500 seats.

Starting lineup 
The starting lineup was based on a metric qualifying system based on the previous race, the 2020 UNOH 188 and owner's points. As a result, Austin Cindric of Team Penske won the pole.

Race results 
Stage 1 Laps: 45

Stage 2 Laps: 45

Stage 3 Laps: 110

References 

2020 NASCAR Xfinity Series
NASCAR races at Dover Motor Speedway
August 2020 sports events in the United States
2020 in sports in Delaware